Only When I Laugh is a 1981 American comedy-drama film based on Neil Simon's 1970 play The Gingerbread Lady.

The story is about an alcoholic Broadway actress who reenters society after a long stay in a rehab clinic. As she tries to stay sober there are the triple responsibilities of raising her estranged teenaged daughter, getting a new acting role and maintaining her co-dependent relations with two close friends; one a wealthy, vain woman who fears the loss of her looks and a gay actor relegated to small roles in third-rate shows.

Simon changed the main character's name to Georgia Hines for the film adaptation; the character was named Evy Meara in the stage version. The main character went from being a cabaret singer to a Broadway stage actress.

The film, written by Simon and directed by Glenn Jordan, stars Marsha Mason, Joan Hackett, James Coco, and Kristy McNichol. It also features two short scenes with then-unknowns Kevin Bacon and John Vargas. Simon's next release, I Ought to Be in Pictures, was released just six months later, and its plot was similar.

It was nominated for Academy Awards for Best Actress in a Leading Role (Marsha Mason), Best Actor in a Supporting Role (James Coco), and Best Actress in a Supporting Role (Joan Hackett). Only When I Laugh proved to be very successful at the box office.

Coco was also nominated for Worst Supporting Actor in Golden Raspberry Awards for the same role.

Plot
Actress Georgia Hines is released from alcohol rehab and returns to her Manhattan apartment and her supportive friends: Jimmy, a gay unemployed actor, and Toby, a sophisticated socialite. She tells them she will maintain her sobriety and slowly ease back into theatre work.

Soon after, Georgia's teenaged daughter Polly, who has been living with her father and her new stepmother, asks if she could move in with her mother. Georgia agrees, although not confident that she is ready.

Georgia receives a phonecall from her ex-lover, writer David Lowe, who asks if they can meet. With a renewed sense of confidence, she strongly refuses and hangs up.

Polly discusses her personal suffering due to Georgia's alcoholism, foremost not being allowed to grow up with her mother.

Georgia feels more confidence, even calling David to apologize and agreeing to meet him for dinner. At dinner, David presents his new script, based on their turbulent, alcohol-filled relationship. He wants Georgia to play the lead/herself. Furious that David brought her there for business, Georgia makes a scene. He calmly asks her to reconsider and she finally laughs, and takes the script home.

The reunion between Georgia and Polly is turning out to be a success. They go shopping together, flirt with college-aged boys who mistake them for sisters, then happily recount their adventure to Jimmy. They surprise him with a musical number Polly's been working on for a school show. In the middle of their performance, Georgia abruptly stops to take a call from David, leaving Jimmy and Polly to sit in silence.

Georgia shines in rehearsals. When she confuses art with life during a scene and loses her composure, David consoles her and tells her that she is the only one who can do this part, tenderly kissing her on the cheek as he exits.

Georgia arrives at a restaurant, happily late from rehearsals, to find Toby in a foul mood. Georgia continues to talk about the play despite Toby revealing that her marriage might be in trouble. Jimmy bounces in with great news that he finally has been given a part in a play. Georgia congratulates him while Toby looks on in silence.

At rehearsals, Georgia brings David a gift-wrapped present. David is taken aback, then introduces Georgia to his new girlfriend. Georgia finally understands that David's affections towards her were only as a friend. Just then, a disconsolate Georgia receives a phone call from Jimmy, learning that Toby's husband has just asked for a divorce. Devastated for their friend, they agree to meet at Toby's that evening.

Georgia is greeted at the door by an impeccably dressed Toby. Georgia keeps refilling Toby's champagne glass while Toby reminisces about life as an enviable college beauty, an untalented actress, and then a perfect wife. Toby's composure crumbles and when she excuses herself to retouch her makeup, Georgia answers the door to a shaking Jimmy. He immediately starts downing champagne and reveals that he was just fired from his play, three nights before the opening, after having invited all his family and friends. Georgia retreats to the kitchen and proceeds to drink multiple glasses of champagne. She returns to the room tipsy and tries to rally her friends, instead shocking them when they realize she has started drinking again.

Polly, unaware of events, arrives at Toby's with her new boyfriend. The three friends form a plan to conceal their problems from Polly, but Georgia, now very drunk, has an over-the-top reaction to Polly and her date. Polly realizes that her mother has relapsed, and that Toby and Jimmy are back to covering up for her. She scolds her mother for her insensitive attitude towards everyone around her, then storms out with her boyfriend.

Jimmy gets Georgia home, where she insists that Jimmy can trust her to be by herself. After he leaves, Georgia goes out to buy cigarettes at a neighborhood bar, but then sits down to start drinking and strikes up a flirty conversation with a stranger. When Georgia leaves, the stranger follows and violently drags her into a darkened alley where he beats her up.

A battered and bleeding Georgia makes it to Toby's, but begs her not to call the police. While Toby tends to Georgia's wounded face, Georgia continues to drink. When Toby tries to make her see how self-destructive she has become, Georgia lashes out and mocks her. A furious Toby finally expresses that she's had it covering for Georgia, telling her to do everyone a favor and stop being such an “astronomical pain in the ass”. The two old friends share a tender laugh and hug and they walk back inside.

The next morning,  Polly tries to convince Georgia to meet for lunch at Tavern at the Green with the father to discuss divided parental responsibilities, but Georgia circumnavigates the subject using the injury as excuse and eventually refuses. Georgia admits to Polly that she isn't ready to handle the responsibilities of caring for another person. Polly feels rejected, again, by her mother's decision. After Polly packs and moves out, Georgia starts to accept Jimmy's consoling when she suddenly realizes that she uses her circle of friends to enable her behavior. The film ends with Georgia meeting Polly and Polly's father for lunch.

Cast

Reception
Roger Ebert gave the film one star out of four and wrote, "The only genuine moments amid the phony landscapes of this film come from Kristy McNichol, who turns in a wonderful performance as Mason's daughter. McNichol carries conviction. She suggests the real passions and hurts that her character must feel. The other people in the movie seem to be drawn from superficial medical advice columns, advice for the lovelorn, and the character insights of popular songs." Gene Siskel of the Chicago Tribune also awarded it one star out of four and wrote, "The script by Neil Simon is as phony as can be, with only McNichol giving any credibility to her character. The film would like to be funny and poignant, and it is neither." Vincent Canby of The New York Times was positive, writing that "Mr. Simon's screenplay is also one of his best, and it's been treated with care by Glenn Jordan, a television director whose first theatrical film this is." Canby found the performances "excellent" with the exception of McNichol, whom he faulted for playing her role "in that triply unreal manner of an adult actress imitating an old-time Hollywood child actress imitating an adult actress." Variety praised a "bravura performance" from McNichol and added, "Glenn Jordan's economic direction is sensitively tuned to the border-treading emotions that populate the film, and manages to almost completely skirt the danger of hackneyed treatment this hardly virgin territory might easily have provoked." Kevin Thomas of the Los Angeles Times called the film "sleekly entertaining, well-produced (in part by Simon himself, a first for him) and a worthy successor to 'The Goodbye Girl' and 'Chapter Two.' David Ansen of Newsweek stated, "Functioning for the first time as his own film producer, Simon made a wise choice in TV director Glenn Jordan. The pathos and the wisecracks don't come at you with the usual relentlessness. Jordan gives both the audience and his excellent cast room to breathe and neatly keeps things just off the brink of overbearing melodrama."

Awards and nominations
James Coco became the first performer in history to be nominated for an Academy Award and a Golden Raspberry Award for the same performance. Since, Amy Irving and Glenn Close have achieved the same feat for their performances in Yentl and Hillbilly Elegy respectively.

Home media
The film is available for streaming rental and digital download through Apple's iTunes Store and Amazon Video. Originally released on Laserdisc, CED Videodisc, and both VHS and Betamax videocassettes, the film is now available on DVD through Amazon via Columbia/Sony's manufacture-on-demand (MOD) business.

References

External links
 
 
 
 
 

1981 films
1981 comedy-drama films
American comedy-drama films
Columbia Pictures films
Films about actors
Films about alcoholism
American films based on plays
Films based on works by Neil Simon
Films directed by Glenn Jordan
Films scored by David Shire
Films featuring a Best Supporting Actress Golden Globe-winning performance
Films set in New York City
Films shot in New York City
Films with screenplays by Neil Simon
1981 directorial debut films
1980s English-language films
1980s American films